Harry Eugene "Hal" Roach Sr. (January 14, 1892 – November 2, 1992) was an American film and television producer, director, screenwriter, and centenarian, who was the founder of the namesake Hal Roach Studios.

Roach was active in the industry from the 1910s to the 1990s and is best remembered today for producing a number of successes including the Laurel and Hardy franchise, the films of entertainer Charley Chase, and the Our Gang short film comedy series.

Early life and career
Hal Roach was born in Elmira, New York, to Charles Henry Roach, whose father was born in Wicklow, County Wicklow, Ireland, and Mabel Gertrude Bally, her father John Bally being from Switzerland. A presentation by the American humorist Mark Twain impressed Roach as a young grade school student.

After an adventurous youth that took him to Alaska, Hal Roach arrived in Hollywood, California, in 1912 and began working as an extra in silent films. Upon coming into an inheritance, he began producing short film comedies in 1915 with his friend Harold Lloyd, who portrayed a character known as Lonesome Luke.

In September 1916, Roach married actress Marguerite Nichols. They had two children, Hal Roach Jr. (June 15, 1918 – March 29, 1972), who followed his father as a producer and director, and Margaret Roach (March 15, 1921 – November 22, 1964), who worked as an actress in the 1930s and 1940s. Marguerite died in March 1941.

Roach married a second time, on September 1, 1942, to Lucille Prin (January 20, 1913 – April 4, 1981), a Los Angeles secretary. They were married at the on-base home of Colonel Franklin C. Wolfe and his wife at Wright-Patterson Airfield in Dayton, Ohio, where Roach was stationed at the time while serving as a major in the United States Army Air Corps. Roach and Lucille had four children, Elizabeth Carson Roach (December 26, 1945 – September 5, 1946), Maria May Roach (born April 14, 1947), Jeanne Alice Roach (born October 7, 1949), and Kathleen Bridget Roach (born January 29, 1951).

Success as a comedy producer

Unable to expand his studios in Downtown Los Angeles because of zoning, Roach purchased what became the Hal Roach Studios from Harry Culver in Culver City, California. During the 1920s and 1930s, he employed Lloyd (his top money-maker until his departure in 1923), Will Rogers, Max Davidson, the Our Gang children, Charley Chase, Harry Langdon, Thelma Todd, ZaSu Pitts, Patsy Kelly and, most famously, Laurel and Hardy. During the 1920s, Roach's biggest rival was producer Mack Sennett. In 1925, Roach hired away Sennett's supervising director, F. Richard Jones.

Roach released his films through Pathé Exchange until 1927, when he struck a distribution deal with Metro-Goldwyn-Mayer. He converted his silent-movie studio to sound in late 1928 and began releasing talking shorts in early 1929. In the days before dubbing, foreign language versions of the Roach comedies were created by reshooting each film in the Spanish, French, and occasionally Italian and German languages. Laurel & Hardy, Charley Chase, and the Our Gang kids (some of whom had barely begun school) were required to recite the foreign dialogue phonetically, often working from blackboards hidden off-camera.

In 1931, with the release of the Laurel & Hardy film Pardon Us, Roach began producing occasional full-length features alongside the short subjects. Two-reel comedies were less profitable than features, and Roach phased most of them out by 1936. When the Our Gang feature film General Spanky did not do as well as expected, Roach intended to disband Our Gang entirely. MGM still wanted the Our Gang short subjects, so Roach agreed to supply them in single-reel (10-minute) form.

In 1937, Roach conceived a joint business venture partnering with Vittorio Mussolini, son of fascist Italian dictator Benito Mussolini, to form a production company called "R.A.M." (Roach and Mussolini). Roach claimed the scheme involved Italian bankers providing US$6 million that would enable Roach's studio to produce a series of 12 films. Eight would be for Italian screening only while the remaining four would receive world distribution. The first film for Italy was to be a feature film of the opera Rigoletto.

This proposed business alliance with Mussolini alarmed MGM, which intervened and forced Roach to buy his way out of the venture. This embarrassment, coupled with the underperformance of much of Roach's latest feature-film output (except Laurel & Hardy titles and the 1937 hit Topper), led to the end of Roach's distribution contract with MGM. In May 1938, Roach sold MGM the production rights and actors contracts to the Our Gang shorts. Roach signed a distribution deal with United Artists at this time. 

From 1937 to 1940, Roach concentrated on producing glossy features, abandoning low comedy almost completely. Most of his new films were either sophisticated farces (like Topper and The Housekeeper's Daughter, 1939) or rugged action fare (like Captain Fury, 1939, and One Million B.C., 1940). Roach's one venture into heavy drama was the acclaimed Of Mice and Men (1939), in which actors Burgess Meredith and Lon Chaney Jr. played the leading roles. The Laurel and Hardy comedies, once the Roach studio's biggest drawing cards, were now the studio's least important product and were phased out altogether in 1940.

In 1940, Roach experimented with medium-length featurettes, running 40 to 50 minutes each. He contended that these "streamliners", as he called them, would be useful in double-feature situations where the main attraction was a longer-length epic. Exhibitors agreed with him and used Roach's mini-features to balance top-heavy double bills. He had intended to introduce the new format with a series of four Laurel and Hardy featurettes, but was overruled by United Artists, which insisted on two Laurel & Hardy feature films instead. United Artists continued to release Roach's streamliners through 1943. By this time, Roach no longer had a resident company of comedy stars and cast his films with familiar featured players (William Tracy and Joe Sawyer, Johnny Downs, Jean Porter, Frank Faylen, William Bendix, George E. Stone, Bobby Watson, etc.).

Recognizing the value of his film library, in 1943 Roach began licensing revivals of his older productions for theatrical distribution through Film Classics, Inc. and home-movie distribution.

World War II and television
Hal Roach Sr., commissioned in the U.S. Army Signal Reserve Corps in 1927, was called back to active military duty in the Signal Corps in June 1942, at age 50. The studio output he oversaw in uniform was converted from entertainment featurettes to military training films. The studios were leased to the U.S. Army Air Forces, and the First Motion Picture Unit made 400 training, morale and propaganda films at "Fort Roach." Members of the unit included Ronald Reagan and Alan Ladd. After the war the government returned the studio to Roach, with millions of dollars of improvements.

In 1946, Hal Roach resumed motion picture production, with former Harold Lloyd co-star Bebe Daniels as an associate producer. Roach was the first Hollywood producer to adopt an all-color production schedule, making four streamliners in Cinecolor, although the increased production costs did not result in increased revenue. In 1948, with his studio deeply in debt, Roach re-established his studio for television production, with Hal Roach Jr., producing series such as The Stu Erwin Show, Steve Donovan, Western Marshal, Racket Squad, The Public Defender, The Gale Storm Show, Rocky Jones, Space Ranger and My Little Margie, and independent producers leasing the facilities for such programs as Amos 'n' Andy, The Life of Riley and The Abbott and Costello Show. By 1951, the studio was producing 1,500 hours of television programs a year, nearly three times Hollywood's annual output of feature movies.

Roach's old theatrical films were also early arrivals on television. His Laurel and Hardy comedies were successful in television syndication, as were the Our Gang comedies he produced from 1929 to 1938.

Later years
In 1955, Roach sold his interests in the production company to his son, Hal Roach Jr., and retired from active production. The younger Roach lacked much of his father's business acumen and was forced to sell the studio in 1958 to The Scranton Corporation, a division of the automobile-parts conglomerate F. L. Jacobs Co. The Roach studio finally shut down in 1961.

For two more decades, Roach Sr. occasionally worked as a consultant on projects related to his past work. In 1983 the "Hal Roach Studios" name was reactivated as a video concern, pioneering the new field of colorizing movies. Roach lent his film library to the cause but was otherwise not involved in the new video productions. Extremely vigorous into an advanced age, Roach contemplated a comedy comeback at 96.

In 1984, 92-year-old Roach was presented with an honorary Academy Award. Former Our Gang members Jackie Cooper and George "Spanky" McFarland made the presentation to a flattered Roach, with McFarland thanking the producer for hiring him 53 years prior. An additional Our Gang member, Ernie Morrison, was in the crowd and started the standing ovation for Roach. Years earlier Cooper had been the youngest Academy Award nominee ever for his performance in Skippy when he had been under contract with Roach. Although Paramount had paid Roach $25,000 for Cooper's services in that film, Roach paid Cooper only his standard salary of $50 per week.

On January 21, 1992, Roach was a guest on The Tonight Show with Johnny Carson, one week after his 100th birthday, where he recounted experiences with such stars as Stan Laurel and Jean Harlow; he even did a brief, energetic demonstration of the "humble hula" dance.  In February 1992, Roach traveled to Berlin to receive the honorary award of the Berlinale Kamera for Lifetime Achievement at the 42nd Berlin International Film Festival.

On March 30, 1992, Roach appeared at the 64th Academy Awards ceremony, hosted by Billy Crystal. When Roach rose from the audience to a standing ovation, he decided to give a speech without a microphone, causing Crystal to quip "I think that's appropriate because Mr. Roach started in silent films."

Death and legacy
Hal Roach died in his home in Bel Air, Los Angeles, from pneumonia, on November 2, 1992, at the age of 100. He had married twice, and had six children, eight grandchildren, and a number of great-grandchildren. Roach outlived three of his children by more than 20 years: Hal Jr. (died in 1972), Margaret (died in 1964), and Elizabeth (died in 1946). He also outlived many of the children who starred in his films. Roach is buried in Woodlawn Cemetery in Elmira, New York, where he grew up.

In the 2018 Laurel and Hardy biopic Stan & Ollie, Roach was portrayed by Danny Huston.

In 2020, Rose McGowan alleged that, in 1937, Roach was responsible for a case of large-scale sexual abuse of actresses. However, no evidence has been produced to substantiate these claims, the only link to him being that an infamous sex party was held by MGM at the Hal Roach Ranch, which was used by the company as a studio.

References

Further reading
 Craig Calman.  100 Years of Brodies with Hal Roach.  BearManor Media, Albany, GA, 2014, 2017

External links

 
 
 Roach filmography and list of publications at FilmReference.com
 Roach's 1992 appearance on The Tonight Show with Jay Leno

1892 births
1992 deaths
Academy Honorary Award recipients
American centenarians
American film producers
American film studio executives
American people of Irish descent
American people of Swiss descent
Burials at Woodlawn Cemetery (Elmira, New York)
Businesspeople from Los Angeles
Cinema pioneers
Deaths from pneumonia in California
Entertainment scandals
Film producers from California
Men centenarians
Our Gang
People from Elmira, New York
Producers who won the Live Action Short Film Academy Award
Silent film directors
Silent film producers
Television producers from California
Television producers from New York (state)
United States Army officers
United States Army personnel of World War II
United States Army reservists